Nova M is a television station in Montenegro with a signal and broadcast licence that covers its entire territory.

History 
Founded by Serbian Pink International Company, Pink M operated as its Montenegrin subsidiary. It was started in December 2002 based out of Podgorica with an additional studio in Budva built and opened during summer 2005. In June 2018, Pink International Company sold to Direct Media its Montenegrin and Bosnian divisions – Pink M and Pink BH, respectively.

Previously aired popular programs 
 UEFA Champions League
 UEFA Europa League
 Premier League (formerly)
 Veliki brat (formerly)

Series currently broadcast

Sports currently broadcast 
Montenegro matches at UEFA Nations League, European Qualifiers, and friendly match (2018–2022).

Previously aired telenovelas

References

External links

Television stations in Montenegro
Television channels and stations established in 2002
Mass media in Podgorica
2002 establishments in Montenegro